Tyśmienica is a river in east central Poland, a tributary of the river Wieprz. It begins in an unnamed lake near Dratów and empties into Wieprz around Wola Skromowska village.

References

 
 This article may be expanded with text translated from the corresponding article in the Polish Wikipedia (April 2014)

Rivers of Poland
Rivers of Lublin Voivodeship